Soul is an album by saxophonist Coleman Hawkins that was recorded in 1958 and released on the Prestige label.

Reception

AllMusic awarded the album 2½ stars, stating: "This is a decent but not very exciting outing. Then 52, Hawkins uses a typically young rhythm section and plays melodically on a variety of originals and standards."

Track listing 
All compositions by Coleman Hawkins except as indicated
 "Soul Blues" - 9:52     
 "I Hadn't Anyone Till You" (Ray Noble) - 4:34     
 "Groovin'" (Kenny Burrell) - 5:43     
 "Greensleeves" (Traditional) - 3:12     
 "Sunday Mornin'" (Burrell) - 6:29     
 "Until the Real Thing Comes Along" (Sammy Cahn, Saul Chaplin, L. E. Freeman, Mann Holiner, Alberta Nichols) - 4:42     
 "Sweetnin'" - 6:49

Personnel 
Coleman Hawkins - tenor saxophone
Ray Bryant - piano
Kenny Burrell - guitar
Wendell Marshall - bass
Osie Johnson - drums

References 

Coleman Hawkins albums
1959 albums
Prestige Records albums
Albums recorded at Van Gelder Studio
Albums produced by Esmond Edwards